Cutigliano was a comune (municipality) in the province of Pistoia in the Italian region Tuscany, located about  northwest of Florence and about  northwest of Pistoia. It has been a frazione of Abetone Cutigliano since 2017.

People

Biagio Betti

Monuments and places of interest

Religious buildings 
 Madonna di Piazza church
 San Bartolomeo church

Civic Buildings 
 Palazzo di Giustizia
 Palazzo del Capitano a Cutigliano

References
 

Cities and towns in Tuscany